Iris van Herpen (born June 5, 1984) is a Dutch fashion designer known for fusing technology with traditional haute couture craftsmanship. Van Herpen opened her own label Iris van Herpen in 2007. In 2011, the Dutch designer became a guest-member of the Parisian Chambre Syndicale de la Haute Couture, part of the Fédération française de la couture. Since then, Van Herpen has continuously exhibited her new collections at Paris Fashion Week. Van Herpen's work has been included in the Metropolitan Museum of Art, the Victoria & Albert Museum, the Cooper-Hewitt Museum in New York and the Palais de Tokyo in Paris.

Career
Iris van Herpen graduated from the ArtEZ University of the Arts in Arnhem in 2006 and interned at Alexander McQueen in London, and Claudy Jongstra in Amsterdam before launching her own label in 2007. The Dutch designer debuted her first Couture collection 'Chemical Crows’, at the 2007 Amsterdam Fashion Week.

Van Herpen was one of the first designers to adopt 3D-printing as a garment construction technique.

Since 2009, pop star Lady Gaga has worn Iris van Herpen's designs on several occasions. In 2012, Lady Gaga wore a custom shiny black Couture dress for the launch of her perfume Fame. The shape of the perfume bottle served as the inspiration of the dress, which Van Herpen constructed from laser-cut strips of black acrylic. Van Herpen has also made use of silicones, iron filings, and resin.

In November 2023, Iris van Herpen will exhibit her work at the Musée des Arts décoratifs

Future in fashion design 
Iris van Herpen takes fashion into the future. Combining craftsmanship with digital technology, she creates an entirely new way to experience clothing. Most notably, the Dutch designer was one of the first to present 3-D-printed dresses in both static and flexible forms on the runway, in a collaboration with the Belgian company Materialise. Since then, her evolution has continued. Her Voltage collection explored the interaction between clothing and electricity. She used Scanning Electron Microscope technology for her Micro collection. And she is known not just for using unique materials, but also for creating her own.

Collaborations
Because of van Herpen's multidisciplinary approach to creation, she has collaborated with various artists such as Jolan van der Wiel and Neri Oxman and architects such as Philip Beesley and Benthem and Crouwel Architects. The designer's interest in science and technology has led to ongoing conversations with CERN (The European Organization for Nuclear Research) and Massachusetts Institute of Technology.

Further collaborations;

Björk
Benjamin Millepied
Sasha Waltz
Nick Knight

Awards and recognition 
 ANDAM Grand Prix Award (2014)
 STARTS Prize, granted by the European Commission (2016)
 Johannes Vermeer Award, Dutch state prize for the arts (2017)

References

External links

 

1984 births
Living people
Dutch fashion designers
Dutch women fashion designers
People from West Maas en Waal